Earl Sutton Smith (February 14, 1897 – June 8, 1963) was an American professional baseball player. He played as a catcher in Major League Baseball from 1919 to 1930. He would play for the New York Giants, Boston Braves, Pittsburgh Pirates, and St. Louis Cardinals.

In 860 games over 12 seasons, Smith posted a .303 batting average (686-for-2264) with 225 runs, 115 doubles, 19 triples, 46 home runs, 355 RBI, 247 bases on balls, .374 on-base percentage and .432 slugging percentage. He finished his career with a .971 fielding percentage. In five World Series over 17 games (1921,'22,'25,'27 and '28) Smith batted .239 (11-for-46) with no runs or RBI.

External links

1897 births
1963 deaths
Major League Baseball catchers
Baseball players from Arkansas
New York Giants (NL) players
Boston Braves players
Pittsburgh Pirates players
St. Louis Cardinals players
People from Sheridan, Arkansas
Burials at Little Rock National Cemetery
Nashville Vols players
Waxahachie Athletics players